The Sassauna is a mountain in the Rätikon range of the Alps, overlooking Schiers in the Swiss canton of Graubünden.

References

External links
 Sassauna on Hikr

Mountains of the Alps
Mountains of Graubünden
Mountains of Switzerland
Two-thousanders of Switzerland
Schiers